The Miss America 2019 pageant/competition was the 92nd Miss America pageant, though the Miss America Organization celebrated its 98th anniversary in 2018. This discrepancy is due to national pageants not being held from 1928–1932 or in 1934 because of financial problems associated with the Great Depression. The 2019 competition was held in Atlantic City, New Jersey. On May 23, 2018, it was announced that the pageant would air live on ABC on Sunday, September 9, 2018. This was the last Miss America to be aired on ABC before would be moving to NBC beginning from 2020 pageant.

At the end of the event, Miss America 2018, Cara Mund of North Dakota, officially crowned her successor, Nia Franklin of New York, as Miss America 2019.

Overview

Miss America 2.0 / Changes to competition and judging criteria
On June 5, 2018, it was announced that Miss America contestants would no longer be judged based on their physical appearance and that the national Miss America event would be considered a competition, rather than a pageant, and the titleholders now candidates, rather than contestants. The swimsuit competition was replaced with state titleholders participating in a live interactive session with the judges, "to highlight her achievements and goals in life and how she will use her talents, passion, and ambition to perform the job of Miss America."

The red carpet, formerly evening gown, competition allowed contestants to choose clothing, "that makes them feel confident, expresses their personal style, and shows how they hope to advance the role of Miss America." In interviews, Gretchen Carlson, the chair of the Board of Trustees of the Miss America Organization, emphasized the organization's desire to be more welcoming, "open, transparent, [and] inclusive to women," and to prioritize displaying the talent and scholarship in the contestants. These changes were announced by Carlson and the Miss America Organization after numerous titleholders were crowned after competing in state pageants with swimsuit competitions. 

At the time the Miss America 2019 competition began, 46 of 51 state organizations (as well as 23 former Miss America winners) had signed a petition calling for the resignation of Carlson and CEO, Regina Hopper, from the Miss America Organization. The states who had not signed were Arkansas, Kentucky, Minnesota, Nevada, and Vermont.

Organization of competition
The preliminary competition consisted of private interviews, "red carpet" evening wear, an on-stage interview, and talent competitions. The private interview is a ten-minute session during which the candidate answers questions from the panel of preliminary judges which took place on September 4 and 5. The interview accounts for 20% of each titleholder's preliminary score. The "red carpet" evening wear competition (making up 15% of preliminary scores) consists of candidates walking down a literal red carpet and then being given 8 seconds to answer rapid fire questions relevant to their "social impact initiative," formerly referred to as a platform. The on stage interview preliminary award is replacing the lifestyle and fitness (swimsuit) preliminary award which was awarded at every Miss America pageant from 1940 to 2018. This interview portion of the competition makes up 15% of the preliminary score and consists of each candidate being asked a question by the judges and then having 20 seconds to answer. Scores from the preliminary competition determines the top 15 finalists who went on to compete on the televised final night of competition. 

For the final night of competition, the top 15 candidates were selected based on their scores from the preliminary competition, which accounted for 25% of their final night score. The top 15 were first scored by the final night judges in an onstage interview with questions written by fellow finalists (termed "peer-to-peer questions"), accounting for 25% of their final night score and with ten contestants advancing. The top ten competed in the  "red carpet" evening wear portion of the competition, contributing 20% of their scores. No candidates were eliminated after evening wear, and all top 10 performed their talent, serving as 30% of their total score. The total scores after these phases of competition determined the top 5 contestants. Each remaining candidate then drew a number to select a judge and had 20 seconds to answer that judge's assigned question; the scores from these questions then determined the winner of the competition and the placement of the other finalists.

Judges

Preliminary judges
On September 4–7, 2018, judges for the preliminary competition selected winners of the preliminary competitions as well as the top 15 finalists for the final night of competition on September 9, 2018. The panel included president and founder of Tragedy Assistance Program for Survivors, Bonnie Carroll; arts and education executive, Courtney Blackwell Burton; Emmy Award-winning hair designer and stylist, Bobby H. Grayson; musician, J'Anna Jacoby; managing editor of The Root, Lyne Pitts; TV host and New York Times bestselling author, Nancy Redd; and entrepreneur, Bill Townsend.

Final night judges
The panel of judges on the final night of competition on September 9, 2018 included professional boxer, Laila Ali; radio host, Bobby Bones; Grammy-winning producer and musician, Randy Jackson; country singer and TV personality, Jessie James Decker; TV journalist, Soledad O'Brien; entrepreneur and podcast host, Alli Webb; and singer/songwriter, Carnie Wilson.

Results

Placements

Order of announcements

Top 15

Top 10

Top 5

Awards

Preliminary awards

Quality of Life awards

Children's Miracle Network (CMN) National Miracle Maker awards

STEM Scholarship awards

Women in Business Scholarship awards

Other awards

Candidates
The Miss America 2019 candidates are:

Notes

References

2019
2018 beauty pageants
2018 in New Jersey
2018 in the United States
September 2018 events in the United States
Events in Atlantic City, New Jersey